Schistura kengtungensis is a species of ray-finned fish in the stone loach genus Schistura. It is found in the Mekong basin in China, Thailand, Myanmar and Laos.

References

K
Fish described in 1936